City of Sheffield Rowing Club is a rowing club on the Damflask Reservoir, based at the Damflask Rowing Centre, Low Bradfield, Sheffield, South Yorkshire and is affiliated to British Rowing.

History
The club was founded in 1968 and has produced British champions in 1977 and 1997.

Honours

British champions

References

Sport in South Yorkshire
Sports clubs in Yorkshire
Rowing clubs in England